Holy Trinity Church, Southwell is a parish church in the Church of England in Southwell, Nottinghamshire.

The church is Grade II listed by the Department for Digital, Culture, Media and Sport as it is a building of special architectural or historic interest.

History

The church was built in 1844 to 1846 by Weightman and Hadfield of Sheffield in the early English style
It cost £2,500 to build (equivalent to £ as of ),.

Incumbents
  Revd John Connington 1846–1878
 ?
 Canon Ernest Arthur Coghill 1890–1941
 ?
 Canon Ian Keith Wrey Savile 1974 - 1980
 Revd Edward Anthony Colin Cardwell 1981 - 1992
 Canon Mark Stuart Tanner 1993 - 2013
 Revd Andrew Porter 2013 -

Organ

The church pipe organ was built by Gray and Davison in 1867. It was restored by Bishop in 1892 and Norman and Beard in 1913. A specification of the organ as recorded in 1975 can be found on the National Pipe Organ Register. The organ is no longer present.

Organists
Miss A.E. Calvert
Oswald Linton ca. 1939

Sources

Southwell
Southwell
Southwell, Nottinghamshire